La Crosse, Wisconsin is a city in the U.S. state of Wisconsin and the county seat of La Crosse County.

La Crosse may also refer to:

Inhabited places in the United States
 La Crosse, Georgia, an unincorporated community in Schley County, Georgia
 La Crosse, Illinois, an unincorporated community in Hancock County, Illinois
 La Crosse, Indiana, a town in LaPorte County, Indiana
 La Crosse, Kansas, a city in and the county seat of Rush County, Kansas
 La Crosse, Missouri, an unincorporated community in
 La Crosse, Virginia, a town in Mecklenburg County, Virginia
 La Crosse, Washington, a rural small town in Whitman County, Washington
 La Crosse County, Wisconsin, a county located in the state of Wisconsin
 La Crosse Metropolitan Area, encompassing La Crosse County, Wisconsin and Houston County, Minnesota
 La Crosse Township, Jackson County, Minnesota, a township in Jackson County, Minnesota

Other
 La Crosse (grape), a hybrid cultivar of wine grape
 La Crosse encephalitis, encephalitis caused by an arbovirus
 La Crosse River, a tributary of the Mississippi
 La Crosse station, an Amtrak intercity train station in La Crosse, Wisconsin
 La Crosse Technology, a manufacturer of electronic products
 Roman Catholic Diocese of La Crosse, a Roman Catholic diocese of the Catholic Church encompassing the city of La Crosse and 19 counties

See also 
 Crosse, a surname
 Île-à-la-Crosse (disambiguation)
 Lacrosse (disambiguation)